Fangs of Fate is a 1928 American silent action film directed by Noel M. Smith and starring Henry Hebert and Kathleen Collins. It was produced as a vehicle for Klondike the Dog, an imitator of Rin Tin Tin.

Cast
 Klondike the Dog as Klondike 
 Arnold Gray as Arnold Barcklay 
 Henry Hebert as Eli Hargraves 
 Robert Reault as Robert Winter 
 Kathleen Collins as Dorothy Winter 
 Alfred Fisher as Jed Morgan

References

Bibliography
 Munden, Kenneth White. The American Film Institute Catalog of Motion Pictures Produced in the United States, Part 1. University of California Press, 1997.

External links
 

1928 films
1920s action adventure films
American silent feature films
American action adventure films
Films directed by Noel M. Smith
American black-and-white films
Pathé Exchange films
1920s English-language films
1920s American films
Silent action adventure films